Sunshine Suzanne Sykes (born 1974) is an American lawyer serving as a United States district judge of the United States District Court for the Central District of California. She previously served as a judge of the California Superior Court for Riverside County.

Early life and education 
Sykes was born on the Navajo Nation Reservation in Tuba City, Arizona, and was raised in Gallup, New Mexico. She earned a Bachelor of Arts degree from Stanford University in 1997 and a Juris Doctor from Stanford Law School in 2001.

Career 

From 2001 to 2003, Sykes worked as a staff attorney for  California Indian Legal Services. From 2003 to 2005, she was a contract attorney for the Defense Panel at the Southwest Justice Center. She also worked for the California Department of Social Services. From 2005 to 2013, Sykes served as deputy county counsel for Riverside County, California. In 2013, she was nominated by then-Governor Jerry Brown to serve as a judge on the Riverside County Superior Court.

Federal judicial service 
On December 15, 2021, President Joe Biden nominated Sykes to serve as a United States district judge of the United States District Court for the Central District of California. Presiden Biden nominated Sykes to the seat vacated by Judge James V. Selna, who assumed senior status on March 3, 2020. On February 1, 2022, a hearing on her nomination was held before the Senate Judiciary Committee. On March 10, 2022, her nomination was reported out of committee by a 12–10 vote. On May 17, 2022, the United States Senate invoked cloture on her nomination by a 51–45 vote. On May 18, 2022, her nomination was confirmed by a 51–45 vote. She received her judicial commission on June 14, 2022. Sykes became the fifth American Indian ever to serve on the federal bench.

See also 
List of Native American jurists

References

External links 
 

1974 births
Living people
21st-century American women lawyers
21st-century American lawyers
21st-century American judges
21st-century Native Americans
21st-century Native American women
21st-century American women judges
California lawyers
Judges of the United States District Court for the Central District of California
Native American judges
Native American lawyers
People from Riverside County, California
People from Tuba City, Arizona
People from Gallup, New Mexico
Stanford University alumni
Stanford Law School alumni
United States district court judges appointed by Joe Biden